Traveller Alien Module 2: K'kree is a 1984 role-playing game supplement for Traveller, written by J. Andrew Keith and Loren K. Wiseman, cover by David Dietrick, and published by Game Designers' Workshop. Part of the classic Traveller Alien Modules series.

Contents
K'kree is a supplement that details the race known to humanity as the Centaurs.

Reception
Craig Sheeley reviewed K'kree in Space Gamer No. 71. Sheeley commented that "The K'kree are a difficult race to game, but their difference should help to enliven any Traveller campaign.  At [the price], 'K'kree is a good buy for the amount of material included."

Steve Nutt reviewed Alien Module: K'Kree for Imagine magazine, and stated that "This module is a good way to expand your knowledge of the Traveller universe, and this alone will probably sell it, in spite of the shortcomings."

Bob McWilliams reviewed K'Kree, Alien Module 2 for White Dwarf #65, giving it an overall rating of 7 out of 10, and stated that "Three adventures are provided and together they form a much better introduction (than with Aslan)."

Reviews
 Dragon #136 (Aug., 1988)

See also
 List of Classic Traveller Alien Modules

References

Role-playing game supplements introduced in 1984
Traveller (role-playing game) supplements